Neocylloepus is a genus of riffle beetles in the family Elmidae. There are about eight described species in Neocylloepus.

Species
These eight species belong to the genus Neocylloepus:
 Neocylloepus arringtoni Brown, 1970
 Neocylloepus boeseli Brown, 1970
 Neocylloepus championi (Sharp, 1882)
 Neocylloepus chaparensis Manzo & Moya, 2010
 Neocylloepus hintoni Brown, 1970
 Neocylloepus petersoni Brown, 1970
 Neocylloepus sandersoni Brown, 1970
 Neocylloepus sculptipennis (Sharp, 1882)

References

Further reading

 
 
 
 
 

Elmidae
Articles created by Qbugbot